Matthew or Matt Ellis may refer to:

Matthew Ellis (British musician), pseudonym of novelist Michael Cox
Matt Ellis (Australian musician) (born 1973), Australian singer-songwriter
Matthew Ellis, member of A Hope for Home
Matt Ellis (ice hockey) (born 1981), Canadian ice hockey left winger
Matthew Ellis (police commissioner), Conservative Police and Crime Commissioner for Staffordshire Police
Matt Ellis (Family Affairs), a character in the British TV soap opera Family Affairs
Matthew Ellis (Marvel Cinematic Universe), a fictional president of the United States of America portrayed by William Sadler in the Marvel Cinematic Universe